Beautiful Animals is a 2017 psychological thriller novel by British writer Lawrence Osborne. Set on the Greek island of Hydra, it was featured in July 2017 on the cover of the "New York Times Book Review" and reviewed by Katie Kitamura. It also received rave reviews from Lionel Shriver in the Washington Post and from John Powers at NPR's Fresh Air.

On a hike during a white-hot summer break on the Greek island of Hydra, Naomi and Samantha make a startling discovery: a man named Faoud, sleeping heavily, exposed to the elements, but still alive. Naomi, the daughter of a wealthy British art collector who has owned a villa in the exclusive hills for decades, convinces Sam, a younger American girl on vacation with her family, to help this stranger. As the two women learn more about the man, a migrant from Syria and a casualty of the crisis raging across the Aegean Sea, their own burgeoning friendship intensifies. But when their seemingly simple plan to help Faoud unravels all must face the horrific consequences they have set in motion.

In this brilliant psychological study of manipulation and greed, Lawrence Osborne explores the dark heart of friendship, and shows just how often the road to hell is paved with the best of intentions.

As announced by The Hollywood Reporter, a film adaptation is currently underway with Amazon Studios and American producer John Lesher

References

British thriller novels
Novels by Laurence Osborne